Centreline Air Services was a commuter airline that operated in the United Kingdom from 1978 to 1983.

History 
Centreline Air Services was founded by John Willis, Capt Mike Hogan, Richard Vipond and Andrew Vipond, in 1978. The airline began air taxi services within the UK and Europe with a Cessna 310Q and Piper Navajo Chieftain in the same year. On 31 May 1980, the airline began services with the Embraer EMB-110 from Luton to Glasgow on a contract carrying the London Times newspaper. In 1982, the airline leased another EMB-110, and struck an agreement with Dan-Air, in which Centreline would operate feeder services on behalf of Dan-Air to Bristol and Glasgow, via Cardiff, and return. All of Centreline's aircraft were re-painted in Dan-Air colours. Unfortunately, Dan-Air, faced with major reductions in income and routes, terminated its contract with Centreline, and in 1983 Centreline Air Services ceased operations.

Routes 
Centreline originally operated air taxi services, but operated scheduled services to Bristol, Cardiff and Glasgow for the Dan-Air Link City service.

Fleet 
The airline's overall fleet consisted of:

 Cessna 310Q
 Embraer EMB 110 Bandeirante 
 Hawker Siddeley HS 748
 Piper Navajo Chieftain

See also 

 Dan-Air

References 

Defunct airlines of the United Kingdom
Airlines established in 1978
Airlines disestablished in 1983
Dan-Air